Jean-Pierre Dellard (8 April 1774 – 7 July 1832) was a French general.

1774 births
1832 deaths
Barons of the First French Empire
French generals
Officiers of the Légion d'honneur
Order of Saint Louis recipients